is a former Japanese football player and manager. His elder brother Kiyoshi is also a former footballer.

Playing career
Okuma was born in Saitama on January 19, 1969. After graduating from Chuo University, he joined Hitachi (later Kashiwa Reysol) in 1991. He played many matches as defensive midfielder from first season. In 1996, he moved to newly was promoted to J1 League club, Kyoto Purple Sanga. He played many matches in 1996 and he became a regular player in 1997. In 1998, he moved to Avispa Fukuoka and played in 1 season. He retired end of 1998 season.

Coaching career
After retirement, Okuma started coaching career at Avispa Fukuoka in 1999. In 2005, he moved to Cerezo Osaka and served as coach. In 2007, he became a coach for Japan U-20 national team. In 2010, he returned to Cerezo Osaka and became a manager for youth team. In September 2014, top team manager Marco Pezzaiuoli was sacked for poor results. Okuma became a new manager as Pezzaiuoli successor. However Cerezo finished at the 17th place of 18 clubs in 2014 season. Cerezo was relegated to J2 League and Okuma resigned a manager. In 2015, he became a manager for youth team. In 2016, he became a manager for new team Cerezo Osaka U-23.

Club statistics

Managerial statistics
Update; December 31, 2018

References

External links
 
 
 sports.geocities.jp

1969 births
Living people
Chuo University alumni
Association football people from Saitama Prefecture
Japanese footballers
Japan Soccer League players
J1 League players
Japan Football League (1992–1998) players
Kashiwa Reysol players
Kyoto Sanga FC players
Avispa Fukuoka players
Japanese football managers
J1 League managers
J3 League managers
Cerezo Osaka managers
Cerezo Osaka U-23 managers
Sportspeople from Saitama (city)
Association football midfielders